Ji Kyeong-Deuk  (born c. 1989) is a South Korean footballer who plays as a winger for Dangjin Citizen FC in the K3 League.

External links 

1980s births
Living people
Association football midfielders
South Korean footballers
Daejeon Hana Citizen FC players
Chungju Hummel FC players
K League 1 players
K League 2 players